Glen Acres is a census-designated place in Hidalgo County, New Mexico, United States. Its population was 208 as of the 2010 census. The community is located along U.S. Route 70. The community's streets are named after golfers (e.g. Sam Sneed (sic) Drive, Lee Trevino Drive, Tom Shaw Road).

Geography

Demographics

References

Census-designated places in New Mexico
Census-designated places in Hidalgo County, New Mexico